Kokummi Mountain is a mountain on Vancouver Island, British Columbia, Canada, located  south of Sayward and  southeast of Mount Schoen.

See also
 List of mountains of Canada

References

Vancouver Island Ranges
One-thousanders of British Columbia
Rupert Land District